The men's half marathon event at the 2007 All-Africa Games was held on July 20.

Results

References
Results

Half marathon
Half marathons